"My Woman's Good to Me" is a song written by Billy Sherrill and Glenn Sutton, and recorded by American country music artist David Houston. It was released in January 1969 as the third single from his album Where Love Used to Live/My Woman's Good to Me. The song peaked at number 4 on the Billboard Hot Country Singles chart. It also reached number 1 on the RPM Country Tracks chart in Canada.

George Benson recorded "My Woman's Good to Me" on May 20, 1969 and included his version on the album Tell It Like It Is. Benson's version, recorded in New York, charted in the lower reaches of the Billboard Hot 100. In the following decade it became popular in the United Kingdom on the flourishing Northern Soul scene.

Chart performance

References

1969 singles
David Houston (singer) songs
Songs written by Billy Sherrill
Songs written by Glenn Sutton
Epic Records singles
1969 songs
George Benson songs
A&M Records singles